Turkish Review was a bimonthly journal published by Feza Publications, focusing primarily on Turkish politics and foreign policy, international affairs, global economics, integration and ideas, and matters related to global socio-political issues. It was available in print on newsstands and in bookstores; select articles are available online.
Turkish Review also included press reviews, book reviews, interviews, and Turkish politics spotlights.

Along with the printed journal, Turkish Review also made strong use of its website, social media websites and tools such as Twitter, Friendfeed and Facebook etc., providing weekly commentary and news on current debates in international affairs and Turkish politics. The published articles and interviews were distributed bimonthly through an e-newsletter.

References

External links
 Turkish Review website 

2010 establishments in Turkey
2016 disestablishments in Turkey
Bi-monthly magazines
Cultural magazines
English-language magazines
Defunct political magazines published in Turkey
Magazines established in 2010
Magazines disestablished in 2016
Mass media shut down in the 2016 Turkish purges
Banned magazines